WCVP-FM (95.9 FM) is a radio station broadcasting a country music format.  Licensed to Robbinsville, North Carolina, United States, the station is currently owned by Cherokee Broadcasting Company, Inc. and features programming from AP Radio and Jones Radio Network.

The station is an affiliate of the Atlanta Braves radio network, the largest radio affiliate network in Major League Baseball.

References

External links

CVP-FM